Mount Stuart or Mt Stuart can refer to:
Mount Stuart, a mountain in the North Cascades range of Washington state, United States
Mount Stuart (Antarctica), a mountain in Victoria Land, Antarctica
Central Mount Stuart in the Northern Territory, near the geographic centre of Australia
Mount Stuart House, a house on the Isle of Bute in Scotland
Mount Stuart, New Zealand, a locality near Milton, New Zealand
Mount Stuart, Tasmania, a suburb of Hobart in Australia
Mount Stuart, Queensland, a mountain overlooking Townsville, Queensland

See also
Mount Stewart (disambiguation)